Oscar Mulero, born Oscar Mulero Crecente, is a techno producer and DJ from Madrid, and the owner of contemporary record labels Warm Up Recordings and Pole Group Recordings. He was also the founder of The Omen Club in Madrid, often considered the start of his professional career. His album from 2012, Black Propaganda, received largely positive reviews in the online techno community.

Discography

Albums
 About Discipline and Education
 Rxxistance vol 1: ERA
 Grey Fades To Green, Warm Up Recordings, 2011	
 Black Propaganda, Warm Up Recordings, 2012	

Singles & EPs
 Sans Souci EP, Warm Up Recordings, 2000	
 Medical Mesh EP, Warm Up Recordings, 2000	
 Bandulero, Kobayashi Recordings, 2000	
 Christian Wünsch / Oscar Mulero - Offshore, Tsunami Records, 2001	
 Floodland EP, Warm Up Recordings, 2001	
 Christian Wünsch / Oscar Mulero - Unexpected, Sheep Records, 2002	
 CV. Is Dead..., Warm Up Recordings, 2002	
 Altered State EP, Coda Records, 2002	
 Ben Sims / Oscar Mulero - Oblivion / Anaconda, Theory Recordings, 2002	
 In Bad Company, Theory Recordings, 2002	
 Learning To Be A Machine, Warm Up Recordings	, 2002	
 The Nine, Warm Up Recordings, 2003	
 Oscar Mulero & Go Hiyama - Art & Strategy, Warm Up Recordings, 2004	
 Primary Instincts, PoleGroup, 2004
 El Hombre Duplicado, Surface, 2004	
 Christian Wünsch & Oscar Mulero - The Damage Done, PoleGroup, 2004	
 Oscar Mulero & Christian Wünsch - The Damage Done Part 2, Tsunami Records, 2004	
 Anaconda, The Remixes, Theory Recordings, 2004	
 Down Force EP, Mainout, 2004	
 Pro-Files, Warm Up Recordings, 2004	
 Christian Wünsch / Oscar Mulero - El Silencio Habla / Fully Sanctioned, PoleGroup, 2005	
 The Gothic Window Effect, Mental Disorder, 2005	
 Exium & Oscar Mulero - Deadly Weapons, Nheoma, 2005		
 Only Dead Fish Go With The Flow, Tresor, 2007	
 Won't Tell You, OM Digital, 2007	
 The Damage Done, OM Digital, 2007	
 Implant EP, Warm Up Recordings, 2007	
 46, Warm Up Recordings, 2007	
 Take Seven EP, Token, 2008	
 Oscar Mulero / Christian* - Newrhythmic 7, New Rhythmic, 2008	
 Process And Reality, Warm Up Recordings, 2008	
 Seleccion Natural Parte 4 (12")	Warm Up Recordings	 2009	
 Oscar Mulero : Svreca - As Thin As Christ, Semantica Records, 2009	
 Asteroid Belt EP, Labyrinth, 2010	
 Exium / Oscar Mulero - 1996 / Nothing To Prove, Warm Up Recordings, 2010	
 Paul Boex / Oscar Mulero - Hate Is Love EP, Dynamic Reflection, 2010	
 Synchronous Rotation, PoleGroup, 2011	
 Horses, PoleGroup, 2011

References

External links
 
 
 

Year of birth missing (living people)
Living people
Spanish record producers
Spanish DJs